TNE may stand for:

 Theta Nu Epsilon, a secret society founded at Wesleyan University in 1870
 New Tanegashima Airport (IATA airport code)